Loewe (stylized as LOEWE) is a Spanish luxury fashion house specialising in leather goods, clothing, perfumes and other fashion accessories. Founded in 1846, Loewe is LVMH's oldest luxury fashion house.

The company was established in 1846 when a group of Spanish leather craftsmen in Madrid were joined by Enrique Loewe, a merchant of Hessian origin. By the early 20th Century, many notable people took great interest in Loewe and Queen Victoria Eugenie became a regular customer. In 1905, Alfonso XIII granted them the Royal Warrant of Appointment and thus Loewe became Purveyor of the Royal Household of Spain. The company quickly grew in popularity and was promoted by figures such as Ernest Hemingway, Ava Gardner, Rita Hayworth, Marlene Dietrich and Sophia Loren amongst others.

History

Loewe was founded in 1846 in Madrid by a group of Spanish leather craftsmen, and the brand originated in 1876 when Enrique Loewe y Roessberg, a German craftsman, joined the group.

King Alfonso XIII of Spain granted Enrique Loewe y Hinton, a descendant of the original brand founder, the title of Purveyor to the Royal Court. His wife, Queen Victoria Eugenie, frequently visited the store on Príncipe de Madrid street.

By the 1970s, Loewe was expanding into perfumes and fashion with the creation of the Loewe anagram logo, designed by Spanish painter Vicente Vela. Giorgio Armani and Laura Biagiotti subsequently designed Loewe's womenswear collections.

In 1986, LVMH bought the rights to Loewe's international distribution. It acquired Loewe completely in 1996. That year, Loewe had sales of about $200 million, among the smallest of LVMH's companies; ready-to-wear was responsible for 10 percent of that total. By 1997, Narciso Rodriguez joined the company as new creative director and the brand had its first Paris runway presentation at LVMH headquarters in the fall/winter 1998 season. Both José Enrique Oña Selfa (2000-2007) and Stuart Vevers (2008-2013) followed. During Vever's tenure, Loewe scaled back fashion to concentrate on handbags, leather apparel and a substantial gift business based on leather picture frames and leather boxes.

Jonathan Anderson became Loewe's creative director in 2013. His first ready-to-wear collections for Loewe were presented in 2014. He has also been deploying a series of publicity campaigns by Steven Meisel and Damien Ropero for the stillife.

Since 2014, Loewe's headquarters – including the design team, which had previously been based in Madrid – has been located on Place Saint-Sulpice in Paris. The company remains based in Spain. Manufacture, particularly of leather goods, takes place in Barcelona and Getafe, near Madrid. 

The current King of Spain's mother, Queen Sofía, has been seen several times wearing Loewe handbags, as well as Queen Letizia.

Locations
Loewe stores are located worldwide. In 2014, Loewe’s 143 stores were concentrated mainly in Spain and Japan, which respectively had 37 and 27 locations. The first London shop opened in 1963, on Mayfair's Mount Street. 

Loewe opened its first American store in New York, a three-story shop at the Trump Tower, in 1983; it closed 1993. Today, the company has four stores in the US, located in Miami's Design District (since 2016), at the Wynn Hotel in Las Vegas (since 2018), in New York (since 2019) and on Rodeo Drive in Los Angeles (since 2022).

In 2016, Loewe opened Casa Loewe Madrid, the brand’s first flagship in Madrid and – with  – its largest store in the world. It is located in the ground floor of the company's head office in a landmark 19th-century building. In 2019, Loewe outgrew its London store in Mount Street and opened Casa Loewe at 41-42 New Bond Street.

Loewe Foundation
In 1988, Enrique Loewe y Lynch, great-grandchild of the firm's creator, founded the Loewe Foundation, a private cultural foundation that supports cultural events and exhibitions. Today, his daughter Sheila Loewe is the President of the foundation supporting design and craftsmanship. The foundation received a Gold Medal for Merit in the Fine Arts from the Spanish government in 2002. Following an initiative of designer Jonathan Anderson, the Loewe Foundation Craft Prize was established in 2017.

Campaigns
Loewe’s global brand ambassadors are Josh O'Connor (since 2017), Tang Wei (since 2022), South Korean girl group Nmixx (since 2022), and Taylor Russell (since 2022). 

For his first Loewe ad campaigns, Jonathan Anderson worked with Steven Meisel; he has since worked with Tyler Mitchell (2020) and Juergen Teller (since 2021).

Branding evolution

References 

LVMH brands
Luxury brands
High fashion brands
Spanish brands
Clothing companies established in 1846
Spanish Royal Warrant holders
Companies based in Madrid
Clothing companies of Spain
1846 establishments in Spain
Spanish subsidiaries of foreign companies